The Idanre Hill, or Oke Idanre is located in Idanre town in Ondo State of southwestern Nigeria.

The Idanre hill is well-known for its landscape. Its wide variety on cultural sites as 'Owa's Palace', shrines, The Old Court, Belfry, Agbooogun footprint, thunder water (Omi Apaara) and burial grounds have since brought the location fame and the nation's nomination for the UNESCO World Heritage Site shortlist. It resides 3000 ft (914.4meters) above sea level and houses a unique ecosystem upon which the cultural landscape has Integrated.

Geology 

Idanre Hills is located on a Precambrian igneous batholith that is about 500 Million years old, and is cut by several large fracture that form deep valleys within the rocks.

World Heritage status 
This site was added to the UNESCO World Heritage Tentative List on October 8, 2007 in the Cultural category.

Myths 
Idanre Hill is said to have 9 ancient wonders and beliefs

All the following myths are located on the Idanre hills;

1. "Ibi Akaso" The Steps
2. The King's Palace
3. Agboogun’s Legacy
4. Unreadable signs
5. Agboogun's footprint
6. The wonderful mat
7. "Omi Aopara" Aopara Water
8. The Orosun Hill
9. Arun river

Wildlife 

Amietophrynus perreti, or the Perret's toad, is only known from a single locality at the Idanre Hill.
The five sites where forest elephants are found in southern Nigeria are the Omo Forests in Ogun State, the Okomu National Park in Edo State, the Cross River National Park in Cross River State, the Idanre Forests and Osse River Park in Ondo State and the Andoni Island in Rivers State. (Nigerian Conservation Foundation)

Civilization 

The ancient settlement of Idanre has existed on the hill since antiquity, however Western civilization was introduced to the ancient city when a team of missionaries led by Rev. Gilbert Carter arrived in the year 1894. 

The missionaries built the first primary school in the year 1896 of which the clay building still stands strong till this day. In the year 1906, a law court was established which includes an ancient prison where the convicts spend their jail term.

Notes

References 
Oke Idanre (Idanre Hill) - UNESCO World Heritage Centre Retrieved 2009-03-03.
http://www.ncfnigeria.org/careers/item/163-forest-elephant-alive-campaign

Nigerian culture
Tourist attractions in Ondo State
Mountains and hills of Yorubaland
Hills of Nigeria
World Heritage Sites in Nigeria
Inselbergs of Africa